The 2004 K League Championship was the eighth competition of the K League Championship, and was held to decide the 22nd champions of the K League. After the regular season was finished, the first stage winners, the second stage winners, and the top two clubs in the overall table qualified for the championship. Each semi-final was played as a single match, and the final consisted of two matches.

Qualified teams

Bracket

Semi-finals

Pohang vs Ulsan

Suwon vs Jeonnam

Final

First leg

Second leg

0–0 on aggregate. Suwon Samsung Bluewings won 4–3 on penalties.

Final table

See also
2004 K League

External links
News at K League 
Match report at K League 

K League Championship
K